Bricklayer is a black and white photograph taken by August Sander in 1928. It was included in his book Face of Our Time (1931), which depicts several professions and people from all the German society at the time of the Weimar Republic. It was also included in the list of the 100 most influential photographs ever taken by Time magazine.

Description
The photograph depicts a bricklayer from Cologne, in Germany, apparently on his working day, emerging from the darkness, with a severe expression and his head illuminated by the light, dressed on his casual work clothing and wearing a cap. One of his hands holds the platform where he carries on his shoulders a significant and seemingly heavy number of bricks, while the other hand rests on his hip. The man's head is framed by the cargo that he carries, and the lines of the bricks evoke those of his attire.

The photograph illustrates the strength and hard work of the profession of the bricklayer, while also demonstrating his dignity and a certain pride that he seems to have in it.

Art market
A print of the photograph was sold by $749,000 at Sotheby's New York, on 11 December 2014.

Public collections
There are prints of the photograph in several public collections, including the Museum of Modern Art, in New York, The Art Institute of Chicago, the Minneapolis Institute of Art, and the San Francisco Museum of Modern Art.

See also
 List of photographs considered the most important

References

1928 in art
1920s photographs
Photographs by August Sander
Black-and-white photographs
Photographs of the Museum of Modern Art (New York City)
Photographs of the Art Institute of Chicago
Photographs of the San Francisco Museum of Modern Art